The 1869 United States Senate election in Pennsylvania was held on January 19, 1869. John Scott was elected by the Pennsylvania General Assembly to the United States Senate.

Results
The Pennsylvania General Assembly, consisting of the House of Representatives and the Senate, convened on January 19, 1869, to elect a Senator to serve the term beginning on March 4, 1869. The results of the vote of both houses combined are as follows:

|-
|-bgcolor="#EEEEEE"
| colspan="3" align="right" | Totals
| align="right" | 133
| align="right" | 100.00%
|}

See also 
 United States Senate elections, 1868 and 1869

References

External links
Pennsylvania Election Statistics: 1682-2006 from the Wilkes University Election Statistics Project

1869
Pennsylvania
United States Senate